Sir Arthur Cory Cory-Wright, 2nd Baronet (18 November 1869 – 21 April 1951) was a British businessman.

He was the son of Sir Cory Francis Cory-Wright, 1st Baronet, and Mima Owen. He was educated at Harrow School and at Merton College, Oxford, where he graduated in 1891 with a BA and with an MA in 1896.

He was a Justice of the Peace (JP) for Middlesex and Hertfordshire. In 1892 he became a partner in the family firm of William Cory & Son, coal factors, steamship owners, etc., of London. At that time his father was the Company's senior partner. When William Cory & Son was floated as a limited liability company in 1896, Arthur Cory-Wright joined the Board of Directors when his father was elected its first Chairman. Arthur Cory-Wright became Chairman on the death of his father in 1909. He was also Chairman and Director of Messrs. Rickett, Cockerell & Co. Ltd., and several other companies involved in the coal trade. He succeeded to the title of 2nd Baronet Cory-Wright, of Caen Wood Towers, Highgate St. Pancras, co. London and Hornsey, co. Middlesex on the death of his father on 30 May 1909.

In 1919 he was a member of the Port of London Authority. He married Elizabeth Olive Clothier, daughter of Henry Clothier, on 18 November 1891. Cory-Wright was appointed High Sheriff of Hertfordshire for 1921.

Sir Arthur Cory-Wright died on 21 April 1951, aged 81. He was succeeded to the title of Baronet Cory-Wright by his son Geoffrey Cory-Wright.

References

External links
Cory-Wright on thePeerage.com
Who's Who in Durham Mining Museum

1869 births
1951 deaths
People educated at Harrow School
Alumni of Merton College, Oxford
Baronets in the Baronetage of the United Kingdom
High Sheriffs of Hertfordshire